This is a list of TV series produced by The Walt Disney Company under its various in-house subsidiaries, that were not bought or acquired from elsewhere.

It includes: Walt Disney Productions and Disney Branded Television. Some of these shows were originally produced by Walt Disney during his lifetime, while others were based cartoons Walt originally produced.

Live action television series
{| class="wikitable sortable" style="margin: 1em 1em 1em 0; background: #f9f9f9; border: 1px #aaa solid; border-collapse: collapse; font-size: 95%;"
|-bgcolor="#B0C4DE"
! Title
! Original run
! Production company 
! Network
|-
| Walt Disney's Disneyland (1954–58)
Walt Disney Presents (1958–61)
Walt Disney's Wonderful World of Color (1961–69)
Disney's Wonderful World (1979–81)
Walt Disney (1981–83)
The Disney Sunday Movie (1986–88)
The Magical World of Disney (1988–90)
The Wonderful World of Disney (1969–79, 1983–87, 1991–present) 
|| –present || rowspan="7" |Walt Disney Productions || ABC (1954–61, 1986–88, and 1997–present)NBC (1961–81 and 1988–91)CBS (1981–83, 1991–97)
|-
| The Mickey Mouse Club || –, –, – || ABC (1955–1959)Syndication (1977–1979)The Disney Channel (1989–1996)
|-
| Zorro || – || ABC
|-
| The Mouse Factory || – || Syndicated
|-
| Herbie, the Love Bug ||  || rowspan="4" | CBS
|-
| Small & Frye ||  
|-
| Gun Shy ||  
|-
| Zorro and Son ||  || Walt Disney Television 
|-
| Welcome to Pooh Corner || – || Left Coast TelevisionWalt Disney Productions || rowspan="7" | The Disney Channel
|-
| You and Me Kid || – || Walt Disney Productions
|-
| Contraption || – || rowspan="4" | Walt Disney Television
|-
| Mousercise || –
|-
| EPCOT Magazine || –
|-
| Disney Family Album || –
|-
| Dumbo's Circus || – || Left Coast TelevisionWalt Disney Television
|-
| Sidekicks || – || Motown Productions || The Disney Channel/ABC
|-
| Videopolis || – || Walt Disney Television || The Disney Channel
|-
| Teen Angel ||  || || The Disney Channel
|-
| Brand New Life || – || NBC Productions || NBC
|-
| Little Mermaid Island ||  || Jim Henson Productions ||
|-
| The 100 Lives of Black Jack Savage ||  || Stephen J. Cannell Productions || NBC
|-
| Dinosaurs || – || Michael Jacobs ProductionsJim Henson ProductionsWalt Disney Television || ABC
|-
| The Torkelsons || – || Michael Jacobs Productions || NBC
|-
| Adventures in Wonderland || – || Betty Productions || Syndication
|-
| The Secret of Lost Creek ||  || Walt Disney Television || The Disney Channel
|-
| Bill Nye the Science Guy || – || KCTS SeattleMcKenna/Gottlieb Producers, Inc.Rabbit Ears Productions || syndication/PBS
|-
| Walt Disney World Inside Out || – || || The Disney Channel
|-
| Sing Me a Story with Belle || – || Patrick Davidson Productions || Syndication
|-
| Flash Forward || – || Atlantis Films || The Disney Channel
|-
| Brotherly Love || – || Witt/Thomas Productions || The WB
|-
| Going Wild with Jeff Corwin || – || Popular Arts Entertainment || The Disney Channel
|-
| Smart Guy || – || de Passe EntertainmentDanny Kallis Productions || The WB
|-
| Honey, I Shrunk the Kids: The TV Show || – || Plymouth ProductionsSt. Clare Entertainment || Syndication
|-
| Disney Channel in Concert || – || || rowspan="15" | Disney Channel
|-
| Omba Mokomba || – || Popular Arts Entertainment 
|-
| Out of the Box || – || OOTB, Inc. 
|-
| 2 Hour Tour || – || 
|-
| Bug Juice || – || Evolution Film & Tape 
|-
| Off the Wall || – || Media Arts EntertainmentVin Di Bona Productions 
|-
| Mad Libs || – || Slam Dunk ProductionsDick Clark Productions 
|-
| The Famous Jett Jackson || – || Alliance AtlantisEvery Kids is JP Kids 
|-
| So Weird || – || Sugar Entertainment, Ltd. (seasons 1–2)No Equal Entertainment, Inc. (season 3)Fair Dinkum Productions 
|-
| The Jersey || – || Lynch Entertainment 
|-
| Even Stevens || – || Brookwell McNamara Entertainment 
|-
| In a Heartbeat || – || AAC Kids 
|-
| Totally Circus ||  || Buena Vista Television 
|-
| Lizzie McGuire || – || Stan Rogow Productions 
|-
| Totally Hoops ||  || Evolution Films 
|-
| The Book of Pooh || – || Shadow Projects || Playhouse Disney
|-
| Zapping Zone || 2001–2012 || The Walt Disney Company Latin America || Disney Channel
|-
| Totally in Tune ||  || Evolution Film & Tape || Disney Channel
|-
| That's So Raven || – || Brookwell McNamara Entertainment (2003–06)That's So Productions (2006–07)Warren & Rinsler Productions (2006–07) || Disney Channel
|-
| Phil of the Future || – || 2929 Productions || Disney Channel
|-
| The Eyes of Nye ||  || (distribution only: produced by KCTS-TV) || PBS
|-
| Breakfast with Bear ||  || Shadow ProjectsJim Henson Television || Playhouse Disney
|-
| Johnny and the Sprites || – || Happy Puppet Productions (seasons 1–2)Homegirl Productions (season 1) || Playhouse Disney
|-
| The Suite Life of Zack & Cody || – || It's a Laugh Productions || rowspan="4" | Disney Channel
|-
| Hannah Montana || – || It's a Laugh ProductionsMichael Poryes Productions
|-
| Cory in the House || – || It's a Laugh ProductionsWarren & Rinsler Productions
|-
| Wizards of Waverly Place || – || It's a Laugh Productions
|-
| Bunnytown || – || Baker Coogan ProductionsSpiffy Pictures || Playhouse Disney
|-
| The Suite Life on Deck || – || It's a Laugh ProductionsDanny Kallis Productions (seasons 1–2)Bon Mot Productions (season 3) || Disney Channel
|-
| Imagination Movers || – || Penn/Bright EntertainmentZydeco Productions || Playhouse Disney
|-
| Sonny with a Chance || – || Varsity PicturesIt's a Laugh Productions || Disney Channel
|-
| Aaron Stone || – || Shaftesbury FilmsThree Hearts Productions || Disney XD
|-
| Jonas || – || Mantis Productions (season 1)Turtle Rock ProductionsIt's a Laugh Productions || Disney Channel
|-
| Zeke and Luther || – || Turtle Rock Productions || rowspan="2" | Disney XD
|-
| I'm in the Band || – || rowspan="4" | It's a Laugh Productions 
|-
| Good Luck Charlie || – || rowspan="2" | Disney Channel
|-
| Shake It Up || – 
|-
| Pair of Kings || – || Disney XD
|-
| A.N.T. Farm || – || Gravy Boat ProductionsIt's a Laugh Productions || rowspan="2" | Disney Channel
|-
| So Random! || – || Varsity PicturesIt's a Laugh Productions
|-
| Kickin' It || – || Poor Soul ProductionsIt's a Laugh Productions || Disney XD
|-
| Jessie || – || Bon Mot ProductionsIt's a Laugh Productions || rowspan="3" | Disney Channel
|-
| Austin & Ally || – || Kevin & Heath ProductionsIt's a Laugh Productions
|-
| PrankStars ||  || Zoo Productions
|-
| Lab Rats || – || It's a Laugh Productions || Disney XD
|-
| Violetta || – || Pol-ka || rowspan="2" | Disney Channel (Latin American)
|-
| The U-Mix Show || – || The Walt Disney Company Latin America
|-
| Code: 9 || 2012 || Evolution Media || Disney Channel
|-
| Crash & Bernstein || – || It's a Laugh Productions || Disney XD
|-
| Dog with a Blog || – || Diphthong ProductionsIt's a Laugh Productions || Disney Channel
|-
| Liv and Maddie || – || Beck & Hart ProductionsOops Doughnuts ProductionsIt's a Laugh Productions || Disney Channel
|-
| Mighty Med || – || It's a Laugh Productions || Disney XD
|-
| I Didn't Do It || – || That's Not So Funny ProductionsIt's a Laugh Productions || Disney Channel
|-
| Win, Lose or Draw ||  || Entertain the Brutes || Disney Channel
|-
| Girl Meets World || – || Michael Jacobs ProductionsIt's a Laugh Productions || Disney Channel
|-
| The Evermoor Chronicles || – || Lime PicturesAll3Media || Disney Channel (British and Irish)
|-
| Kirby Buckets || – || Horizon ProductionsTitmouse, Inc. || Disney XD
|-
| K.C. Undercover || – || Rob Lotterstein ProductionsIt's a Laugh Productions || Disney Channel
|-
| Best Friends Whenever || – || Diphthong ProductionsEntertainment ForceIt's a Laugh Productions || Disney Channel
|-
| Gamer's Guide to Pretty Much Everything || – || Poor Soul Productions37 MonkeysIt's a Laugh Productions || Disney XD
|-
| Bunk'd || 2015–present || Bon Mot Productions (seasons 1–3)That's Not So Funny Productions (season 4)A Little Too You ProductionsIt's a Laugh Productions || Disney Channel
|-
| Lab Rats: Elite Force || 2016 || Britelite ProductionsIt's a Laugh Productions || Disney XD
|-
| Stuck in the Middle || rowspan="2" | 2016–2018 || International Donut Fund ProductionsHorizon Productions || Disney Channel
|-
| Walk the Prank || Blackbird FilmsSullen ChildHorizon Productions || Disney XD
|-
| Bizaardvark || 2016–2019 || It's a Laugh Productions || Disney Channel
|-
| The Lodge || 2016–2017 || Zodiak Kids Studios || Disney Channel (British and Irish)
|- 
| Mech-X4|| 2016–2018 || Marmel DynamicsOmnifilm Entertainment || Disney XD
|-
| Andi Mack|| 2017–2019 || Go Dog GoMM ProductionsHorizon Productions || rowspan="8" | Disney Channel
|-
| Raven's Home || 2017–present || It's a Laugh ProductionsEntertainment Force (season 1)November 13Done Deal Productions (season 2)Funny Boone Productions (mid-season 3)Institute for Individual Education (season 3–4)
|-
| Bug Juice: My Adventures at Camp|| 2018 || Evolution Media
|-
| Coop & Cami Ask the World || 2018–2020 || Bugliari/McLaughlin ProductionIt's a Laugh Productions
|-
| Sydney to the Max || 2019–present || It's a Laugh ProductionsMark Reisman Productions
|-
| Fast Layne || 2019 || Lakeshore ProductionsOmnifilm Entertainment
|-
| Just Roll with It || 2019–present || Blackbird FilmsSullen ChildKenwood TV Productions
|-
| Gabby Duran & the Unsittables || 2019–present || Omnifilm EntertainmentTwo Gorgeous Gentleman 
|-
| High School Musical: The Musical: The Series || 2019–present || Salty Pictures / Disney Channel || rowspan="2"| Disney+
|-
| The Imagineering Story || 2019 || Iwerks & Co.
|-
| Disney Fam Jam || 2020–present || Matador Content || Disney Channel
|-
| The Big Fib || 2020 || Haymaker TV || rowspan="2" | Disney+
|-
| Earth to Ned || 2020–present || The Jim Henson CompanyMarwar Junction Productions
|-
| Secrets of Sulphur Springs || 2021–present || Gwave Productions || Disney Channel
|-
| Behind the Attraction  || 2021–present || Seven Bucks ProductionsThe Nacelle Company || rowspan="4" | Disney+
|-
| Beyond the Stars || 2021 || Fulwell 73 ProductionsOlive Bridge Entertainment
|-
| Intertwined || 2021–present || Pampa FilmsGloriamundi Productions
|-
| The Beatles: Get Back || 2021 || Walt Disney PicturesApple CorpsWingnut Films
|}

Animated series

Programming blocksThe Disney Afternoon (1990–1997)Disney's One Saturday Morning (1997–2002; exclusively for ABC stations)Disney's One Too'' (1999–2003; exclusively for UPN stations)

See also
 List of Disney television series

References

Notes

External links
Big Cartoon Database

Television

Disney